Asuleka is a small uninhabited island in Sanma Province of Vanuatu in the Pacific Ocean. The neighboring islands are Ratua, Malo, and Aore. The island has a natural reserve.

References

Islands of Vanuatu
Sanma Province
Uninhabited islands of Vanuatu